Twin Grove may refer to the following places in the United States:

 Twin Grove, Illinois in McLean County
 Twin Grove, Wisconsin in Jefferson, Green County
 Twin Grove Township, Greenwood County, Kansas

See also 
 Twin Groves, Arkansas in Faulkner County